2003 S.League was the eighth season of Singapore's professional football league. It was won by Home United, which was their second league title.

League table
</onlyinclude>
Gombak United withdrew from the league at the end of the 2002 season.

Foreign players
Each club is allowed to have up to a maximum of 4 foreign players.

 Albirex Niigata (S) and Sinchi FC are not allowed to hire any foreigners.

Top scorers

Source:

References

Singapore Premier League seasons
1
Sing
Sing